Lost Corner is an unincorporated community in Pope County, Arkansas, United States. The community changed its name from Okay to avoid confusion with a community in Howard County with the same name. Lost Corner was selected because of the backwoods location of the community.

Lost Corner consists of a few farms in Pope County northeast of Hector (Pope County) and is near the Van Buren County line. It is located on a ridge between the south fork of the Little Red River to the east and the Illinois Bayou to the west.

References

Unincorporated communities in Pope County, Arkansas
Unincorporated communities in Arkansas